The Greek astronomer Hipparchus introduced two cycles that have been named after him in later literature.

Calendar cycle 
Hipparchus proposed a correction to the 76-year-long Callippic cycle, which itself was proposed as a correction to the 19-year-long Metonic cycle. He may have published it in the book "On the Length of the Year" (Περὶ ἐνιαυσίου μεγέθους), which has since been lost. This is a very close approximation for an integer number of lunations in an integer number of days (with an error of only 0.014 days). However, it is in fact 1.37 days longer than 304 tropical years: the mean tropical year is actually about  day (11 minutes 15 seconds) shorter than the Julian calendar year of  days. These differences cannot be corrected with any cycle that is a multiple of the 19-year cycle of 235 lunations: it is an accumulation of the mismatch between years and months in the basic Metonic cycle, and the lunar months need to be shifted systematically by a day with respect to the solar year (i.e. the Metonic cycle itself needs to be corrected) after every 228 years.

Indeed, from the values of the tropical year (365.2421896698 days) and the synodic month (29.530588853) cited in the respective articles of Wikipedia, it follows that the length of 228=12×19 tropical years is about 83,275.22 days, shorter than the length of 12×235 synodic months, namely about 83,276.26 days, by one day plus about one hour. In fact, an even better correction would be to correcting by two days every 437 years, rather than one day every 228 years. The length of 437=23×19 tropical years, about 159,610.837 days, is shorter than that of  23×235 synodic months, about 159612.833 days, by almost exactly two days, up to only six minutes.

Eclipse cycle 
An eclipse cycle constructed by Hipparchus is described in Ptolemy's Almagest IV.2. Hipparchus constructed a cycle by multiplying by 17 a cycle due to the Chaldean astronomer Kidinnu, so as to closely match an integer number of synodic months (4,267), anomalistic months (4,573), years (345), and days (126,007 + about 1 hour); it is also close to a half-integer number of draconic months (4,630.53...). By comparing his own eclipse observations with Babylonian records from 345 years earlier, he could verify the accuracy of the various periods that the Chaldean astronomers used. 

The Hipparchic eclipse cycle is made up of 25 inex minus 21 saros periods. There are only three or four eclipses in a series of eclipses separated by Hipparchic cycles. For example, the solar eclipse of August 21, 2017 was preceded by one in 1672 and will be followed by one in 2362, but there are none before or after these.

It corresponds to:
4,267 synodic months
4,630.531 draconic months
363.531 eclipse years (727 eclipse seasons)
4,573.002 anomalistic months

References

Ancient Greek astronomy
Time in astronomy
Calendars

fr:Calendrier grec